Zizhuyuan Subdistrict is a subdistrict of Haidian District, Beijing. It borders Haidian Subdistrict to the north, Beixiaguan Subdistrict to the east, Balizhuang and Ganjiakou Subdistricts to the south, and Shuguang Subdistrict to the west. As of 2020, it had a total population of 129,367.

The subdistrict was formed in 1959 as Landingchang subdistrict, and received its current name in 1978 after the Purple Bamboo Park within the region.

Administrative Divisions 
As of 2021, the subdistrict had 22 residential communities within its borders:

See also 
 List of township-level divisions of Beijing

References 

Subdistricts of Beijing
Haidian District